The following is an overview of the events of 2011 in film, including the highest-grossing films, film festivals, award ceremonies and a list of films released and notable deaths. More film sequels were released in 2011 than any other year before it, with 28 sequels released.

Evaluation of the year
Richard Brody of The New Yorker observed that the best films of 2011 "exalt the metaphysical, the fantastical, the transformative, the fourth-wall-breaking, or simply the impossible, and—remarkably—do so ... These films depart from 'reality' ... not in order to forget the irrefutable but in order to face it, to think about it, to act on it more freely". Film critic and filmmaker Scout Tafoya of RogerEbert.com considers the year of 2011 as the best year for cinema, countering the notion of 1939 being film's best year overall, citing examples such as Drive, The Tree of Life, Once Upon a Time in Anatolia, Keyhole, Contagion, The Adventures of Tintin, and Sherlock Holmes: A Game of Shadows. He stated that "2011 housed not just some of the greatest art films of our age, but a revolution in the language of blockbuster filmmaking. One big-budget action film after another used digital cameras to show the world behind explosions in starker, stranger light, while constructing a backbone of classical ideas and images."

Highest-grossing films

The top 10 films released in 2011 by worldwide gross are as follows:

Box office records
Pirates of the Caribbean: On Stranger Tides grossed $1,045,713,802, becoming the second film in the series to have grossed over $1 billion, and the 37th-highest-grossing film of all time.
Harry Potter and the Deathly Hallows – Part 2 grossed $1,342,511,219, becoming the third-highest-grossing film of all time during its theatrical run, the highest-grossing film in the Harry Potter franchise, the highest grossing Warner Bros film and the highest grossing book adaptation and the highest of 2011 as a whole.
In the US and Canada, it set single-day and opening-weekend records, with $91,071,119 and $169,189,427, respectively. In addition, the film set a worldwide opening-weekend record with $483,189,427.
Transformers: Dark of the Moon grossed $1,123,794,079 and is currently the highest-grossing in the series.
2011 was the first year when three films grossed more than $1 billion worldwide, surpassing the previous year's record of two billion-dollar films, and also the first time when at least 10 films grossed more than $500 million worldwide (in 11th and 12th place, Puss in Boots and Sherlock Holmes: A Game of Shadows also earned over $500 million making it twelve films to do so).
Pirates of the Caribbean became the first franchise to have more than one film gross over $1 billion, with On Stranger Tides joining 2006's Dead Man's Chest.
On Stranger Tides also became the fifth film of the decade to surpass the billion-dollar milestone, breaking the previous record of four films (The Lord of the Rings: The Return of the King in 2003, Pirates of the Caribbean: Dead Man's Chest in 2006, The Dark Knight in 2008, and Avatar in 2009) during the 2000s.
 The Shrek franchise became the first animated film series to gross more than $3 billion with the release of Puss in Boots.
  The Smurfs surpassed Alvin and the Chipmunks: The Squeakquel as the highest-grossing live-action/animated film of all time with $563.7 million.

Events
 16th Empire Awards
 17th Screen Actors Guild Awards
 24th European Film Awards
 31st Golden Raspberry Awards
 68th Golden Globe Awards
 64th British Academy Film Awards
 68th Venice International Film Festival
 83rd Academy Awards
 57th Filmfare Awards
 2011 MTV Movie Awards
 2011 Sundance Film Festival

Awards

2011 films 
The list of films released in 2011, arranged by country, are as follows:
 List of American films of 2011
 List of Argentine films of 2011
 List of Australian films of 2011
 List of Brazilian films of 2011
 List of British films of 2011
 List of French films of 2011
 List of Hong Kong films of 2011
 List of Italian films of 2011
 List of Indian films of 2011
 List of Assamese films
 List of Bengali films of 2011
 List of Bollywood films of 2011
 List of Gujarati films
 List of Kannada films of 2011
 List of Malayalam films of 2011
 List of Marathi films of 2011
 List of Odia films of 2011
 List of Punjabi films of 2011
 List of Tamil films of 2011
 List of Telugu films of 2011
 List of Tulu films
 List of Japanese films of 2011
 List of Mexican films of the 2010s
 List of Pakistani films of 2011
 List of Russian films of 2011
 List of South Korean films of 2011
 List of Spanish films of 2011

Deaths

References

 
Film by year